The APRA Music Awards of 2023 are the upcoming 41st annual series, known as the APRA Awards. The awards are given in a series of categories in three divisions and in separate ceremonies throughout the year: the APRA Music Awards, Art Music Awards and Screen Music Awards. The APRA Music Awards are provided by APRA AMCOS (Australasian Performing Right Association and Australasian Mechanical Copyright Owners Society) and celebrate excellence in contemporary music, honouring songwriters and publishers that have achieved artistic excellence and outstanding success in their fields. The ceremony is due on 27 April 2023 at International Convention Centre Sydney.

On 25 January 2023, the 20-songs shortlisted for the APRA Song of the Year was announced.

APRA Music Awards

Art Music Awards

Screen Music Awards

References

2023 in Australian music
2023 music awards
APRA Awards